Recommind (OpenText Recommind) is a subsidiary of OpenText Corporation that builds and sells software for electronic discovery, information governance, enterprise search and content categorization.

History 
Recommind was founded in 2000 by Jan Puzicha, Thomas Hofmann and Derek Schueren. Probabilistic latent semantic analysis (PLSA), a technique used for data analysis, is the underlying methodology for Recommind's software technology. Puzicha and Hofmann introduced and then patented PLSA in 1999, based on research they undertook at University of California, Berkeley.

The company has been named as a leader in enterprise search by Forrester Research. Recommind was selected as a leader in the 2013 Gartner Magic Quadrant for e-discovery.

In 2013, the company was selected as among the world's top 10 most innovative companies in big data by Fast Company. In the same year, it secured an e-discovery review contract with the Securities and Exchange Commission.

In 2016, Recommind was acquired by OpenText for approximately $163 million

References

External links 
 

Defunct software companies of the United States
Companies based in San Francisco
Technology companies based in the San Francisco Bay Area
Companies established in 2000